The Deutscher Verband für Frauenstimmrecht (German Union for Women's Suffrage) was a German women's organization for women's suffrage, active between 1902 and 1919.  It was the first women's suffrage organisation in Germany and came to be one of the three most notable alongside Deutsche Vereinigung für Frauenstimmrecht (1911–1919) and Deutscher Frauenstimmrechtsbund (1913–1919). In 1916, it united with the Deutsche Vereinigung für Frauenstimmrecht and took the name Deutscher Reichsverband für Frauenstimmrecht. It was dissolved when women's suffrage was introduced in 1919.

References

Feminist organisations in Germany
1902 establishments in Germany
1919 disestablishments in Germany
Political organisations based in Germany
Women's suffrage in Germany
Organizations established in 1902
Organizations disestablished in 1919
Voter rights and suffrage organizations